Kenny vs. Spenny is a Canadian reality comedy series which follows the lives of friends Kenny Hotz and Spencer Rice who face each other in various competitions. The loser of each competition must perform an act of humiliation. The humiliation is selected by the winner of each competition unless the competition ends in draw, whereby the film crew decides what act of humiliation both Hotz and Rice must perform. The series is filmed in the house that both Hotz and Rice share in Toronto, Ontario.

The pilot episode premiered on Showcase in 2002. Season one officially began on August 26, 2003, with the competition Who Is the Best Fashion Designer?. Season one consisted of 26 episodes which ran until March 23, 2004.

Series overview
Summary of Wins overall

Episode List

Pilot

Season 1 (2003–2004)

Season 2 (2005–2006)

Season 3 (2006–2007)

Season 4 (2007–2008)

Season 5 (2008)

Season 6 (2009–2010)

Series Finale

References

External links
 List of Kenny vs. Spenny episodes at the Internet Movie Database
 Kenny vs. Spenny at epguides.com

Lists of comedy television series episodes
Lists of Canadian television series episodes